Xingzhou or Xing Prefecture (興州) was a zhou (prefecture) in imperial China, centering on modern Lüeyang County, Shaanxi, China. It existed (intermittently) from 554 until 1207.

References
 

Prefectures of the Sui dynasty
Prefectures of the Tang dynasty
Prefectures of the Song dynasty
Prefectures of Later Shu
Prefectures of Later Tang
Prefectures of Former Shu
Prefectures of Qi (Five Dynasties)
Former prefectures in Shaanxi